The 2008–09 season was Sheffield Wednesday's 107th season in The Football League since being elected to the Football League First Division in 1892.

Season summary
Sheffield Wednesday achieved their first league double over city rivals Sheffield United in 95 years, but that was the highlight of a mediocre season for the Owls. Still, a final 13th-placed finish was an improvement from the relegation struggle of the previous season.

Kit
Italian manufacturers Lotto remained kit manufacturers for the season, as did Sheffield-based internet service provider Plusnet for the kit sponsorship. A new kit was introduced for the season.

Players

First-team squad

Left club during season

Reserve squad

References

Notes

Sheffield Wednesday F.C. seasons
Sheffield Wednesday F.C.